This is a list of adult fiction books that topped The New York Times Fiction Best Seller list in 1963. The list is notable for being blank for part of the winter as the New York Times, like many other newspapers in the city, worked its way through a major newspaper strike. When the strike ended in March, the political thriller Seven Days in May  led the list, having also been at the top at the start of the strike in December 1962. It lasted there only one week before being overtaken by J.D. Salinger's second No. 1 bestseller in 18 months, the anthologized novellas, "Raise High the Roof Beam, Carpenters" and "Seymour: An Introduction". 

Salinger's book led the list for 14 weeks through the spring of 1963. Daphne du Maurier's The Glass-Blowers then spent six weeks on the list, followed by Morris West's novel about the Vatican, The Shoes of the Fisherman (14 weeks). On October 6, Shoes gave way to  Mary McCarthy's semi-autobiographical novel The Group, which would spend the next 20 weeks at the top, closing out the year.

References

1963
.
1963 in the United States